Engenco Limited is an Australian engineering company with operations in Australia, Asia, Europe and America. It is listed on the Australian Stock Exchange.

History
Engenco was founded as Global Turbocharger Specialists Australia by Michael Coote in 1989 providing diesel engine spare parts. It was renamed GTSA Engineering and later Coote Industrial.

In December 2006 Coote Industrial was listed on the Australian Stock Exchange. In November 2010 Coote Industrial was renamed Engenco.

Subsidiaries
As at June 2015 its subsidiaries were:
Centre for Excellence in Rail Training (CERT)
Convair Engineering (Convair)
Drivetrain Power and Propulsion (Drivetrain)
Gemco Rail
Greentrains
Momentum

Previous subsidiaries include:
South Spur Rail Services
Southern & Silverton Rail

Takeover offer
In December 2012 chairman Dale Elphinstone, who was the largest shareholder with a 37.6% stake, made a takeover offer for all the shares in the company. The takeover offer was unsuccessful with Elphinstone only having taken his shareholding up to 65.1% when the offer closed.

References

Companies established in 1989
Manufacturing companies based in Perth, Western Australia